Armand Hippolyte Louis Fizeau FRS FRSE MIF (23 September 181918 September 1896) was a French physicist, who in 1849 measured the speed of light to within 5% accuracy. In 1851, he measured the speed of light in moving water in an experiment known as the Fizeau experiment.

Biography
Fizeau was born in Paris to Louis and Beatrice Fizeau. He married into the de Jussieu botanical family. His earliest work was concerned with improvements in photographic processes. Following suggestions by François Arago, Léon Foucault and Fizeau collaborated in a series of investigations on the interference of light and heat. In 1848, he predicted the redshifting of electromagnetic waves.

In 1849, Fizeau calculated a value for the speed of light to a better precision than the previous value determined by Ole Rømer in 1676. He used a beam of light reflected from a mirror 8633 meters away. The beam passed through the gaps between the teeth of a rapidly rotating wheel with 720 teeth. The speed of the wheel was increased until, at 12.6 rotations per second, the returning light hit the next tooth and could not be seen. At 25.2 rotations per second, the light was again visible. This gives a result of 
, which is within 5% of the correct value (299,792,458 meters per second). (See Fizeau's measurement of the speed of light in air.) Fizeau made the first suggestion in 1864 that the "speed of a light wave be used as a length standard".

In 1850 he measured the relative speeds of light in air and water, using a rotating mirror, however Foucault independently achieved the same result seven weeks earlier.

Fizeau was involved in the discovery of the Doppler effect, which is known in French as the Doppler–Fizeau effect.

In 1853, Fizeau described the use of the capacitor (sometimes called a "condenser") as a means to increase the efficiency of the induction coil. Later on, he studied the thermal expansion of solids and applied the phenomenon of interference of light to the measurement of the dilatations of crystals. He became a member of the Académie des Sciences in 1860 and a member of the Bureau des Longitudes in 1878. He died at Venteuil on 18 September 1896.

"Fizeau" is one of the 72 names inscribed at the base of Eiffel Tower, and of the 72 scientists and engineers listed on the tower, Fizeau is the only one who was still alive when the tower was opened to the public for the 1889 World's Fair.  The crater Fizeau on the far side of the Moon is named after him.

See also
 Daguerreotype
 Michelson stellar interferometer
 Optical chopper
 Léon Foucault

References

External links

Open Library

1819 births
1896 deaths
Scientists from Paris
French physicists
Optical physicists
Foreign Members of the Royal Society
Members of the French Academy of Sciences
Members of the Royal Society of Sciences in Uppsala